Cancellaria lyrata, the lyrate nutmeg, is a species of sea snail, a marine gastropod mollusk in the family Cancellariidae, the nutmeg snails.

Distribution
This species can be found in Cape Verde.

Bibliography
 Rolán E., 2005. Malacological Fauna From The Cape Verde Archipelago. Part 1, Polyplacophora and Gastropoda.

References

Cancellariidae
Gastropods described in 1850
Gastropods of Cape Verde